The Columbia-Shuswap Electoral Area D, referred to by Statistics Canada as Columbia-Shuswap D, is a regional district electoral area in the South-west corner of the Columbia-Shuswap Regional District of British Columbia. It contains the communities of Falkland, Ranchero, and Silver Creek. The population of this area, exclusive of any residents of Indian Reserves, is around 4000 people. Agriculture is the main economy for the area. The Salmon River flows through it before going into Shuswap Lake.

References

Regional district electoral areas in British Columbia
Columbia-Shuswap Regional District